In telecommunication, channel reliability (ChR) is the percentage of time a communication channel was available for use in a specified period of scheduled availability. 

Channel reliability is given by 

where T o is the channel total outage time, T s is the channel total scheduled time, and T a is the channel total available time.

References

External links
Federal Standard 1037C website

Telecommunication theory